The Christian Science Journal is an official monthly publication of the Church of Christ, Scientist through the Christian Science Publishing Society, founded in 1883 by Mary Baker Eddy. The first edition appeared on April 14, 1883, bearing the subtitle, "An Independent Family Paper to Promote Health and Morals". At that time, Eddy was the editor and main contributor to the Journal. The magazine is based in Boston.

The Journal is designed to demonstrate the practical applications of Christian Science healing practice. Instructive articles and verified reports of Christian healing give the reader a working understanding of the Principle and practice of Christian Science. Each issue also contains editorials, interviews, church news, poems, as well as a worldwide directory of Christian Science practitioners, teachers, churches, Reading Rooms, organizations at universities and colleges, and more.

Notable editors and contributors 
Editors
 Septimus J. Hanna
 Annie M. Knott
 William D. McCrackan
Contributors

 Neil Kensington Adam
 Alice Stone Blackwell
 Charles Lightoller

References

External links
Official web site of The Christian Science Journal
Online directory of practitioners, churches, etc. (also printed at the back of each issue of the Journal)
The Christian Science Journal archive at Hathitrust

Monthly magazines published in the United States
Religious magazines published in the United States
Christian Science magazines
Magazines established in 1883
Magazines published in Boston